SS Newton D. Baker was a Liberty ship built in the United States during World War II. She was named after Newton D. Baker, a lawyer, the 37th Mayor of Cleveland, and the United States Secretary of War, during World War I.

Construction
Newton D. Baker was laid down on 3 September 1942, under a Maritime Commission (MARCOM) contract, MC hull 1520, by J.A. Jones Construction, Panama City, Florida; sponsored by Rose Jones, the wife of the James Addison Jones, the founder J.A. Jones Construction Co., she was launched on 25 February 1943.

History
She was allocated to Luckenbach Steamship Co., Inc., on 6 April 1943. On 1 October 1947, she was laid up in the National Defense Reserve Fleet, Mobile, Alabama. On 2 January 1968, she was sold for $46,320 to Union Minerals & Alloys, Co., to be scrapped. She was removed from the fleet on 29 January 1968.

References

Bibliography

 
 
 
 

 

Liberty ships
Ships built in Panama City, Florida
1943 ships
Mobile Reserve Fleet